Phantasis is a genus of longhorn beetles of the subfamily Lamiinae, containing the following species:

 Phantasis ardoini Breuning, 1967
 Phantasis avernica Thomson, 1865
 Phantasis carinata Fåhraeus, 1872
 Phantasis gigantea (Guérin-Méneville, 1844)
 Phantasis nodulosa Sudre & Teocchi
 Phantasis sansibarica (Harold, 1878)
 Phantasis satanica Thomson, 1860
 Phantasis stupida Kolbe, 1894
 Phantasis tenebricosa Sudre & Teocchi

References

Phantasini